The Sevilla Photovoltaic Power Plant was the largest low-concentrated CPV power plant in the world. The facility is located in the Solar Platform (Solucar Complex), a region dedicated to solar power developments, in Sanlúcar la Mayor, Spain.

The plant utilizes 154 two-axis tracking units, consisting of 36 photovoltaic modules each. The plant generates  annually.

See also 

 List of power stations in Spain

References 

Photovoltaic power stations in Spain
Energy in Andalusia